Mohamad Rashid bin Mohamed Aya (born 4 June 1990 in Johor) is a Malaysian footballer currently playing for Felcra F.C. in Malaysia Premier League.

Formerly he has played for Felda United F.C., and Sarawak FA.

References

External links
 

1990 births
Living people
Felda United F.C. players
Malaysian footballers
People from Johor
Malaysian people of Malay descent
Association football midfielders
Association football forwards